Marianowo  is a village in Stargard County, West Pomeranian Voivodeship, in north-western Poland. It is the seat of the gmina (administrative district) called Gmina Marianowo.

The village has a population of 910.

Marienfließ Abbey
The origins of the village go back to the foundation of Cistercian monastery in 1228 by the region's Slavic ruler, Duke of Pomerania, Barnin I the Good (c. 1217/1219 – 13 November 1278) from the Griffin dynasty (ducis Slauorum et Cassubie). In 1228, Cistercian nuns arrived and founded an abbey in Marienfließ (also Marienfliess, Marienflies). After the Protestant Reformation, the nunnery was secularized in 1569, but its purpose, to harbour unmarried or widowed noble women from the Duchy of Pomerania, continued as a Lutheran convent (damsels' foundation) for noble women. One of these noble women was Sidonia von Borcke, famous for her trial for witchcraft in 1620.

On 28 June 1643 Gustavus Adolphus' daughter, Christina of Sweden, leased the estates of Marienfließ nunnery to Francis Henry of Saxe-Lauenburg for 10 years, after which it reverted to the new ruler of Pomerania, Frederick William, the Great elector, on 12 December 1653, rewarding Francis Henry's improvements to the estate.

Under Brandenburg rule the damsels' foundation was restituted, but dissolved in 1945, when Marienfließ was handed over to Poland.

Notable people
 Eleonore Charlotte of Saxe-Lauenburg-Franzhagen (Marienfließ, 8 August 1646 – 26 January 1709, Franzhagen Castle), princess of Saxe-Lauenburg and heiress of Franzhagen estates.
 Manfred Swarsensky (1906 – 1981), German-American rabbi

References

Marianowo